Her Official Fathers is a 1917 American silent film that was co-directed by Elmer Clifton and Joseph Henabery. It was produced as a starring vehicle for Dorothy Gish, and she may have directed some parts of the film.

Her Official Fathers was never registered for a copyright and is technically in the public domain. It is thought to be a lost film.

Plot
Gish plays Janice, a wealthy girl whose fortune has been entrusted to two trust company vice presidents (the "official fathers" of the title). One of the vice presidents proposes marriage to the girl, but Janice also finds herself accepting the proposal of the other vice president's son. Confused over who she prefers, she retracts her acceptance of both proposals and becomes engaged to a bank teller. When the true motives of her three would-be suitors come to light, Janice makes the right decision about whom to marry.

Cast
Dorothy Gish - Janice
Frank Bennett - Steven Peabody
F.A. Turner - John Webster
Sam De Grasse - Ethan Dexter
Fred Warren - Henry Jarvis
Milton Schumann - Winfield Jarvis
Jennie Lee - Aunt Lydia
Richard Cummings - Anthony White
Charles Lee - William Blaine
Hal Wilson - John
Bessie Buskirk - Maid

References

External links

1917 films
1917 lost films
1917 romantic comedy films
American silent feature films
American romantic comedy films
American black-and-white films
Films directed by Elmer Clifton
Films directed by Joseph Henabery
Lost American films
Lost romantic comedy films
1910s American films
Silent romantic comedy films
Silent American comedy films
1910s English-language films